The plant tribe Phaseoleae is one of the subdivisions of the legume subfamily Faboideae, in the unranked NPAAA clade. This group includes many of the beans cultivated for human and animal food, most importantly from the genera Glycine, Phaseolus, and Vigna.

Taxonomy

Although the tribe as defined in the late 20th century does not appear to be monophyletic, there does seem to be a monophyletic group which roughly corresponds to the tribe Phaseoleae (with some changes).  The earlier concept of Phaseoleae is paraphyletic relative to the tribes Abreae and Psoraleeae, plus most of Millettieae and parts of Desmodieae.

The following subtribes and genera are recognized by the USDA:

Cajaninae
 Adenodolichos Harms
 Bolusafra Kuntze
 Cajanus Adans.
 Carrissoa Baker f.
 Chrysoscias E. Mey.
 Dunbaria Wight & Arn.
 Eriosema (DC.) Desv.
 Flemingia Roxb. ex W. T. Aiton
 Paracalyx Ali
 Rhynchosia Lour.

Clitoriinae
 Barbieria DC.
 Centrosema (DC.) Benth.
 Clitoria L.
 Clitoriopsis R. Wilczek
 Periandra Mart. ex Benth.

Diocleinae
 Bionia Mart. ex Benth.
 Camptosema Hook. & Arn.
 Canavalia Adans.
 Cleobulia Mart. ex Benth.
 Collaea DC.
 Cratylia Mart. ex Benth.
 Cymbosema Benth.
 Dioclea Kunth
 Galactia P. Browne
 Lackeya Fortunato et al.
 Luzonia Elmer
 Macropsychanthus Harms ex K. Schum. & Lauterb.
 Neorudolphia Britton
 Rhodopis Urb.

Glycininae
 Afroamphica H.Ohashi & K.Ohashi
 Amphicarpaea Elliott ex Nutt.
 Calopogonium Desv.
 Cologania Kunth
 Dumasia DC.
 Eminia Taub.
 Glycine Willd.
 Herpyza C. Wright
 Neocollettia Hemsl.
 Neonotonia J. A. Lackey
 Neorautanenia Schinz
 Neustanthus Benth.
 Nogra Merr.
 Pachyrhizus Rich. ex DC.
 Phylacium Benn.
 Pseudeminia Verdc.
 Pseudovigna (Harms) Verdc.
 Pueraria DC.
 Sinodolichos Verdc.
 Teramnus P. Browne
 Teyleria Backer
 Toxicopueraria A.N. Egan & B. Pan bis

Kennediinae
 Hardenbergia Benth.
 Kennedia Vent.
 Vandasina Rauschert

Ophrestiinae
 Cruddasia Prain
 Ophrestia H. M. L. Forbes
 Pseudoeriosema Hauman

Phaseolinae
 Alistilus N. E. Br.
 Ancistrotropis A. Delgado
 Austrodolichos Verdc.
 Cochliasanthus Trew
 Condylostylis Piper
 Dipogon Liebm.
 Dolichopsis Hassl.

 Dolichos L.
 Helicotropis A. Delgado
 Lablab Adans.
 Leptospron (Benth.) A. Delgado
 Macroptilium (Benth.) Urb.
 Macrotyloma (Wight & Arn.) Verdc.
 Mysanthus G. P. Lewis & A. Delgado
 Nesphostylis Verdc.
 Oryxis A. Delgado & G. P. Lewis
 Oxyrhynchus Brandegee
 Phaseolus L.
 Physostigma Balf.
 Ramirezella Rose
 Sigmoidotropis (Piper) A. Delgado
 Spathionema Taub.
 Sphenostylis E. Mey.
 Strophostyles Elliott
 Vatovaea Chiov.
 Vigna Savi
 Wajira Thulin 

incertae sedis
 Apios Fabr.
 Butea Roxb. ex Willd.
 Cochlianthus Benth.
 Decorsea R. Vig.
 Diphyllarium Gagnep.
 Dysolobium (Benth.) Prain
 Erythrina L.
 Haymondia A.N. Egan & B. Pan bis
 Mastersia Benth.
 Meizotropis Voigt
 Mucuna Adans.
 Otoptera DC.
 Psophocarpus Neck. ex DC.
 Shuteria Wight & Arn.
 Spatholobus Hassk.
 Strongylodon Vogel

Notes

See also 

 Helena M. L. Forbes

References

External links 

 
Fabaceae tribes